North Bend station is a railway station in North Bend, British Columbia, Canada, located at the border between CPR's Cascade- and Thompson subdivision.

The station is served by Via Rail's Canadian train as a flag stop (48 hours advance notice required). The station is only served by eastbound trains towards Toronto. Westbound trains call at Boston Bar railway station along the CN Railway tracks, on the other side of the Fraser River. This split in service between Vancouver and Ashcroft is due to CN and CPR utilizing directional running through the Thompson- and Fraser Canyon.

Footnotes 

Via Rail stations in British Columbia